Dimawhso is a town in the Kayah State of eastern part of Burma. It is de jure a part of Burma, but is currently controlled by the Karenni National People's Liberation Front as of 15 December 2022 as a result of the 2021–2022 Myanmar civil war.

References

External links
geohack: Dimawhso

Township capitals of Myanmar
Populated places in Kayah State